Paffrath is a surname. Notable people with the name include:

Amy Paffrath (born 1963), American television presenter and actress
Bob Paffrath (1918–2015), American football player
Kevin Paffrath (born 1992), American YouTuber and real estate broker